Vardadzor is a village in the Martuni Municipality of the Gegharkunik Province of Armenia. Lake Sevan lies a few kilometres to the northeast of the village.

Etymology 
The village was previously known as Adamkhan and Atamkhan.

History 
The village was founded in 1828-29 by emigrants from Mush. An Urartian inscription dating to 722-705 BC was found at Vardadzor.

Gallery

References

External links 

 
 

Populated places in Gegharkunik Province
Populated places established in 1828